Tetterwort is a common name for several plants in the family Papaveraceae and may refer to:

Chelidonium majus, native to Europe
Sanguinaria canadensis, native to eastern North America